Changping railway station is a railway station located on Changliu Road, Machikou, Changping District, Beijing.

Changping railway station started to be passed through in 1909, but the station was set later in 1915 to improve the traffic capacity. On November 1, 2016, the station stopped all customer service to reconstruct. It is a station on the Beijing–Zhangjiakou intercity railway, opened on 30 December 2019.

The station is one of the major railway stations in Changping District, but it is much farther than Changping North railway station located in the urban area of Changping District.

References 

Railway stations in Beijing
Changping District
Railway stations in China opened in 2019
Railway stations in China opened in 1915